Hermann Schomberg (22 August 1907 – 16 November 1975) was a German film and television actor.

Filmography

References

Bibliography
 Giesen, Rolf. Nazi Propaganda Films: A History and Filmography. McFarland, 2003.

External links

1907 births
1975 deaths
People from Unna
People from the Province of Westphalia
German male film actors
Officers Crosses of the Order of Merit of the Federal Republic of Germany